Óscar Eduardo Villarreal (born 27 March 1981 in Cali, Colombia) is a Colombian former professional footballer who played as a forward.

Clubs
 América de Cali 1999
 Real Cartagena 2000
 América de Cali 2001–2003
 Aucas 2004
 América de Cali 2005
 San Martín de Porres 2006
 Talleres de Córdoba 2007
 Independiente Santa Fe 2007
 Deportivo Pasto 2008
 Cienciano 2009
 Sporting Cristal 2010
 Total Chalaco 2010

External links
 
 Profile at Ceroacero

1981 births
Living people
Footballers from Cali
Colombian footballers
Association football forwards
América de Cali footballers
Real Cartagena footballers
S.D. Aucas footballers
Club Deportivo Universidad de San Martín de Porres players
Talleres de Córdoba footballers
Independiente Santa Fe footballers
Deportivo Pasto footballers
Cienciano footballers
Sporting Cristal footballers
Total Chalaco footballers
Colombian expatriate footballers
Colombian expatriate sportspeople in Ecuador
Expatriate footballers in Ecuador
Colombian expatriate sportspeople in Argentina
Expatriate footballers in Argentina
Colombian expatriate sportspeople in Peru
Expatriate footballers in Peru